Andraž Struna (born 23 April 1989) is a Slovenian footballer who plays as a full-back. He is the brother of fellow Slovenian footballer Aljaž Struna.

Club career

Cracovia
In December 2010, Struna joined Cracovia on a three-and-a-half year contract.

PAS Giannina
In summer 2013, he signed for the Super League Greece club PAS Giannina. His contract expired on 30 June 2016 without signing a new one. He had 89 appearances in all competitions.

Heart of Midlothian
On 18 January 2017, he signed for Scottish Premiership team Heart of Midlothian on a short-term deal. He was released by the club at the end of the season after failing to agree to a contract extension.

New York City FC
On 6 September 2017, Struna signed with New York City FC.

Voluntari
On 17 September 2019, Struna joined Liga I side Voluntari.

Triestina
On 8 September 2020, he signed a two-year contract with Serie C club Triestina.

International career
Struna played for the Slovenian under-21 team between 2009 and 2010. He made his senior debut on 15 August 2012 in na friendly match against Romania.

Career statistics

Club

International
Scores and results list Slovenia's goal tally first, score column indicates score after each Struna goal.

Honours
Koper
Slovenian First League: 2009–10
Supercup: 2010

See also
Slovenian international players

References

External links

NZS profile 

1989 births
Living people
People from Piran
Slovenian footballers
Association football fullbacks
FC Koper players
MKS Cracovia (football) players
PAS Giannina F.C. players
Heart of Midlothian F.C. players
New York City FC players
Anorthosis Famagusta F.C. players
FC Voluntari players
U.S. Triestina Calcio 1918 players
NK Tabor Sežana players
Slovenian PrvaLiga players
Ekstraklasa players
I liga players
Super League Greece players
Scottish Professional Football League players
Major League Soccer players
Cypriot First Division players
Liga I players
Serie C players
Slovenian expatriate footballers
Slovenian expatriate sportspeople in Poland
Expatriate footballers in Poland
Slovenian expatriate sportspeople in Greece
Expatriate footballers in Greece
Slovenian expatriate sportspeople in the United Kingdom
Expatriate footballers in Scotland
Slovenian expatriate sportspeople in the United States
Expatriate soccer players in the United States
Slovenian expatriate sportspeople in Cyprus
Expatriate footballers in Cyprus
Slovenian expatriate sportspeople in Romania
Expatriate footballers in Romania
Slovenian expatriate sportspeople in Italy
Expatriate footballers in Italy
Slovenia youth international footballers
Slovenia under-21 international footballers
Slovenia international footballers